Anne of Viennois (died 1299), was a Countess regnant suo jure of Viennois and Albon from 1282 to 1299, and the daughter of Guigues VI of Viennois and Beatrice of Montferrat. She married Humbert, Baron of La Tour du Pin in 1273. She was buried in the Carthusian monastery of Salette, in the barony of La Tour.

Issue
John II (1280 † 1319), succeeded his father as dauphin of Viennois
 Hugues († 1329), baron de Faucigny
 Guigues († 1319), seigneur de Montauban.
 Alix (1280 † 1309), married John I (1275 † 1333), count of Forez in 1296
 Marie, married Aymar de Poitiers-Valentinois
 Marguerite, married Frederick I († 1336), Marquis of Saluzzo in 1303
 Béatrice (1275 † 1347), married Hugh I of Chalon-Arlay in 1312
 Henri (1296 † 1349), bishop of Metz
 Catherine († 1337), married Philip of Savoy (1278 † 1334), count of Piedmont and prince of Achaea in 1312

References

1299 deaths
13th-century women rulers
Dauphins of Viennois
Counts of Albon

Year of birth unknown